The women's BMX racing competition at the 2016 Olympic Games in Rio de Janeiro took place on 17 and 19 August 2016 at the Olympic BMX Centre.

The medals were presented by Camiel Eurlings, IOC member, Netherlands and Brian Cookson, President of the UCI.

Schedule 
All times are Brasília Time (UTC−03:00)

Results

Seeding run

Semi-finals
Standings after run 2:

Semi-final 1

Semi-final 2

Final

References

Women's BMX
BMX at the Summer Olympics
2016 in women's BMX
Women's events at the 2016 Summer Olympics